Sibley–Elmdorf Historic District is a national historic district located at Rochester, Monroe County, New York.  The district encompasses 840 contributing buildings (486 primary buildings) and 1 contributing site in a predominantly residential section of Rochester.  The district developed between about 1904 and 1963, and includes buildings in a variety of architectural styles including Classical Revival, Colonial Revival, Gothic Revival, Tudor Revival, Mission Revival, American Foursquare and Bungalow / American Craftsman.  The dwellings reflect designs directed toward a middle-class clientele in a newly developing area of Rochester's Nineteenth Ward. Located in the district is the Westminster Presbyterian Church (now the New Life Fellowship Church, 1915), West High School (now known as the Joseph C. Wilson Magnet High School, 1905) by Rochester architect J. Foster Warner, Walter Spencer Public School #16 (c. 1911), and Aberdeen Square Park (c. 1915).

It was listed on the National Register of Historic Places in 2015.

See also
 National Register of Historic Places listings in Rochester, New York

References

External links

Historic districts on the National Register of Historic Places in New York (state)
Houses on the National Register of Historic Places in New York (state)
Neoclassical architecture in New York (state)
Gothic Revival architecture in New York (state)
Colonial Revival architecture in New York (state)
Tudor Revival architecture in New York (state)
Mission Revival architecture in New York (state)
Historic districts in Rochester, New York
National Register of Historic Places in Rochester, New York